Kellita Smith (born January 15, 1969) is an American actress, model and comedian. She is best known for her role as Wanda McCullough, Bernie Mac's wife on the FOX sitcom The Bernie Mac Show.

Life and career 
Born in Chicago, Illinois, She was raised in Oakland, California. Smith studied at Santa Rosa Junior College, receiving her associate degree in political science.

In early years, Smith worked as a model. She began her acting career on stage in a regional production of Tell It Like It Tiz. Other theatrical credits include the Los Angeles productions of No Place to be Somebody at the K.C. Theatre Company, Feelings (The Hudson Theatre) for which she won an NAACP Theatre Award for Best Supporting Actress in 1996, The Thirteenth Thorn (Complex Theatre) for which she was nominated for an NAACP Theatre Award for Best Actress, and One Woman Two Lives, which premiered at The Imagined Life Theater in July 2009.

On television, Smith made her debut in an episode of In Living Color and later guest-starred on Living Single, Moesha, 3rd Rock from the Sun, The Parkers and NYPD Blue. She had recurring roles in Martin, Sister, Sister, and Malcolm & Eddie before co-starring on The Jamie Foxx Show from 1997 to 1999. In 2001 she was cast opposite Bernie Mac in the Fox sitcom The Bernie Mac Show. The series aired on Fox for five seasons from 2001 to 2006. She was nominated four times for a NAACP Image Award for her role as Wanda McCullough on The Bernie Mac Show. In film, Smith co-starred alongside Mo'Nique in Hair Show (2004), and later appeared in Fair Game, King's Ransom, Roll Bounce and Three Can Play That Game.

In 2012, Smith returned to television with the role of First Lady Katherine Johnson in the syndicated sitcom, The First Family. In 2014, Smith was cast as Roberta Warren in the Syfy post-apocalyptic series, Z Nation. In this role, she also appeared on Sharknado 3: Oh Hell No! in 2015. In the Cut is an American sitcom created by Bentley Kyle Evans that debuted on Bounce TV on August 25, 2015.[1]  Seth Kelley. "Bounce TV Orders Original Comedy Series 'In The Cut'". Variety. Retrieved January 28, 2016.  Kellita Smith as Cheryl (season 2–present), the new owner of the beauty salon Cheryl's, and Jay's wife. On March 19, 2020, it was announced that the sixth season would premiere on April 1, 2020.[8]  ""In the Cut" Returns for New Season Starting April 1st on Bounce". The Futon Critic. March 19, 2020.

She is also described as B. Rosenberger Rosenberg's African American girlfriend in Charlie Kaufman's novel Antkind.

Filmography

Film

Television

Awards and nominations

References

External links 
 

1969 births
Living people
African-American actresses
American female models
American women comedians
American film actresses
American television actresses
Actresses from Chicago
20th-century American actresses
21st-century American actresses
Comedians from Illinois
20th-century American comedians
21st-century American comedians